Little Britches may refer to:
	
Little Britches (book), an autobiographical work by Ralph Moody
Little Britches (outlaw) (aka Jennie Stevens, born 1879), American Old West outlaw
Little Britches on the Road, a television series about rural communities
Little Britches Rodeo, a rodeo competition for youths age 5 to 18
Little Britches Rodeo (TV series), a television series about Little Britches Rodeo competition
Cattle Annie and Little Britches, a 1981 Western drama
National Little Britches Rodeo Association, a youth based rodeo organization